Castroville Historic District is a United States historic district in Castroville, Texas. It includes the oldest parts of the city of Castroville and contains twelve designated contributing properties, including a Texas State Historic Site and numerous Recorded Texas Historic Landmarks. The district was listed on the National Register of Historic Places in 1970.

History and significance
Long after its foundation the city retained a strongly Alsatian character, both in the continued common use of the Alsatian language into the mid-twentieth century, and in the Alsatian architecture that characterizes the community to the present day.

The oldest portion of the city, surrounded on three sides by a bend in the Medina River, was designated a United States historic district on the National Register of Historic Places on April 3, 1970, in recognition of the old town's well-preserved colonial Alsatian architecture and unusual cultural heritage, for which it is known as the "little Alsace" of Texas. Castroville's was one of the first three United States historic districts to be designated in Texas.

The NRHP nomination specified twelve contributing properties within the district, including the Landmark Inn State Historic Site (an NRHP-listed site in its own right), St. Louis Catholic Church, and a number of private residences exemplifying the prevailing architectural style. Including some of these twelve properties, the district contains numerous Recorded Texas Historic Landmarks, many of them especially well-preserved residences of early colonists.

Architectural character
The structures surveyed during the designation of the historic district, constructed between 1844 and the 1880s, share common architectural elements that mark the old town's Alsatian character. The oldest houses typically contain two rooms and a loft, with thick, stuccoed limestone walls, beams of cypress or cedar wood, and sloping, gabled roofs of tin or cypress wood shingles. A kitchen is typically either attached as a rear shed or built into a nearby free-standing structure. The houses are generally set close to the fronts of their lots, and many have full-width front porches.

Historic properties

See also

National Register of Historic Places listings in Medina County, Texas
Recorded Texas Historic Landmarks in Medina County

References

External links

National Register of Historic Places in Medina County, Texas
Recorded Texas Historic Landmarks
Texas state historic sites
Historic districts on the National Register of Historic Places in Texas
French-American culture in Texas
German-American culture in Texas